Abul-Abbas Ahmad ibn Ali al-Mandjur al-Miknasi al-Fasi (1520–1587, born and died in Fes) was a Moroccan scholar of theology and law and a prominent teacher at the Qarawiyyin University. He is known to have educated qadis for several Moroccan towns. Between 1579 and 1585 he spent much time in Marrakesh, where he taught the Moroccan sultan Ahmad al-Mansur.  He is the author of theological commentaries and especially his fahrasa (account of his scholarly career) is of great renown. He was the father of the well-known writer Ahmad Ibn al-Qadi.

References

Moroccan scholars
Moroccan biographers
1520 births
1587 deaths
Moroccan Maliki scholars
16th-century Moroccan judges
People from Fez, Morocco
16th-century Moroccan writers